Imperiale (translit. Vyzantini rapsodia) is a 1968 Greek drama film directed by George Skalenakis. The film was selected as the Greek entry for the Best Foreign Language Film at the 41st Academy Awards, but was not accepted as a nominee.

Cast
 Kostas Karras as Emperor
 Betty Arvaniti as Zoi
 Thodoros Roubanis as (as Theodoros Roubanis)
 Yanis Alexandridis
 Giorgos Oikonomou
 Venia Palliri
 Christos Parlas
 Yannis Totsikas
 Nikos Tsachiridis
 Giorgos Zaifidis
 Hristoforos Zikas
 Christos Zorbas

See also
 List of submissions to the 41st Academy Awards for Best Foreign Language Film
 List of Greek submissions for the Academy Award for Best Foreign Language Film

References

External links
 
 ΒΥΖΑΝΤΙΝΗ ΡΑΨΩΔΙΑ  filmography entry in Greek with several images from the film

1968 films
Greek drama films
1960s Greek-language films
1968 drama films
Films directed by George Skalenakis